Ceto is a primordial sea goddess in Greek mythology, the daughter of Pontus and his mother, Gaia. As a mythological figure, she is considered to be one of the most ancient deities, and bore a host of monstrous children fathered by Phorcys, another child of Gaia and Pontus. The small Solar System body 65489 Ceto was named after her, and its satellite after Phorcys.

Ceto was also variously called Crataeis (Κράταιις, Krataiis, from κραταιίς "mighty") and Trienus (Τρίενος, Trienos, from τρίενος "within three years"), and was occasionally conflated by scholars with the goddess Hecate (for whom Crataeis and Trienus are also epithets).

This goddess should not be confused with the minor Oceanid also named Ceto,  or with various mythological beings referred to as ketos (plural kētē or ketea); this is a general term for "sea monster" in Ancient Greek.

Family
Besides Ceto, Gaia (Earth) and Pontus had four other offspring, Nereus, Thaumas, Phorcys and Eurybia. Hesiod's Theogony lists the children of Ceto and Phorcys as the two Graiae: Pemphredo and Enyo, and the three Gorgons: Sthenno, Euryale, and Medusa, with their last offspring being an unnamed serpent (later called Ladon, by Apollonius of Rhodes) who guards the golden apples. Also according to Hesiod, the half-woman, half-snake Echidna was born to a "she" who was probably meant by Hesiod to be Ceto, (with Phorcys the likely father); however the "she" might instead refer to the Oceanid Callirhoe. The mythographer Pherecydes of Athens (5th century BC) has Echidna as the daughter of Phorcys, without naming a mother.

The mythographers Apollodorus and Hyginus, each name a third Graiae, as the offspring of Ceto and Phorcys, Dino and Persis respectively. Apollodorus and Hyginus also make Ladon the offspring of Echidna and Typhon, rather than Ceto and Phorcys.

The Scholiast on Apollonius Rhodius cites Phorcys and Ceto as the parents of the Hesperides, but this assertion is not repeated in other ancient sources.

Ceto is possibly the mother of the Nemean lion and the Sphinx by her grandson Orthrus.

Homer refers to Thoosa, the mother of Polyphemus in the Odyssey, as a daughter of Phorcys, but does not indicate whether Ceto is her mother.

Cult
Pliny the Elder mentions worship of "storied Ceto" at Joppa (now Jaffa), in a single reference, immediately after his mention of Andromeda, whom Perseus rescued from a sea-monster. S. Safrai and M. Stern suggest the possibility that someone at Joppa established a cult of the monster under the name Ceto.  As an alternative explanation, they posit that Pliny or his source misread the name cetus—or that of the Syrian goddess Derceto.

Notes

References 
 Athanassakis, Apostolos N, Hesiod: Theogony, Works and days, Shield, JHU Press, 2004. .
 Apollodorus, The Library with an English Translation by Sir James George Frazer, F.B.A., F.R.S. in 2 Volumes, Cambridge, MA, Harvard University Press; London, William Heinemann Ltd. 1921. ISBN 0-674-99135-4. Online version at the Perseus Digital Library. Greek text available from the same website.
 Apollonius of Rhodes, Argonautica, edited and translated by William H. Race, Loeb Classical Library No. 1, Cambridge, Massachusetts, Harvard University Press, 2009. . Online version at Harvard University Press.
 Caldwell, Richard, Hesiod's Theogony, Focus Publishing/R. Pullins Company (June 1, 1987). .
 Clay, Jenny Strauss, Hesiod's Cosmos,  Cambridge University Press, 2003. .
 Fowler, R. L., Early Greek Mythography: Volume 1: Text and Introduction, Oxford University Press, 2000. .
 Hyginus, Gaius Julius, Fabulae, in The Myths of Hyginus, edited and translated by Mary A. Grant, Lawrence: University of Kansas Press, 1960. Online version at ToposText.
 Gantz, Timothy, Early Greek Myth: A Guide to Literary and Artistic Sources, Johns Hopkins University Press, 1996, Two volumes:  (Vol. 1),  (Vol. 2).
 Grimal, Pierre, The Dictionary of Classical Mythology, Wiley-Blackwell, 1996, .
 Hard, Robin (2004), The Routledge Handbook of Greek Mythology: Based on H.J. Rose's "Handbook of Greek Mythology", Psychology Press, 2004, . Google Books.
 Hesiod, Theogony from The Homeric Hymns and Homerica with an English Translation by Hugh G. Evelyn-White, Cambridge, MA.,Harvard University Press; London, William Heinemann Ltd. 1914. Online version at the Perseus Digital Library. Greek text available from the same website.
 Homer, The Odyssey with an English Translation by A.T. Murray, PH.D. in two volumes. Cambridge, MA., Harvard University Press; London, William Heinemann, Ltd. 1919. . Online version at the Perseus Digital Library. Greek text available from the same website.
 Morford, Mark P. O., Robert J. Lenardon, Classical Mythology, Eighth Edition, Oxford University Press, 2007. .
 Most, G.W., Hesiod, Theogony, Works and Days, Testimonia, Edited and translated by Glenn W. Most, Loeb Classical Library No. 57, Cambridge, Massachusetts, Harvard University Press, 2018. . Online version at Harvard University Press.
 Rose, Herbert Jennings, "Echidna" in  The Oxford Classical Dictionary, Hammond and Scullard (editors), Second Edition, Oxford University Press, 1992. 
 Smith, William, Dictionary of Greek and Roman Biography and Mythology, London (1873).
 West, M. L., Hesiod: Theogony, Oxford University Press.

Further reading 
 Aken, Dr. A.R.A. van. (1961). Elseviers Mythologische Encyclopedie. Amsterdam: Elsevier.
 Bartelink, Dr. G.J.M. (1988). Prisma van de mythologie. Utrecht: Het Spectrum.

Greek goddesses
Sea and river goddesses
Children of Gaia
Female legendary creatures
Monsters in Greek mythology
Sea monsters